The Reutlingen–Schelklingen railway or Swabian Jura Railway (German: Schwäbische Albbahn) is a 58.25 kilometre long branch line from Reutlingen to Schelklingen, which crosses the Swabian Jura in southern Germany. Its route no. is 4620. The section from  Reutlingen to Honau is also known as the Echaz Railway (Echazbahn) or Echaz Valley Railway (Echaztalbahn). The 15.28 kilometre long northern section from Reutlingen to Kleinengstingen is closed nowadays, this section has been largely converted into a rail trail.

Photos

References

Footnotes

Sources

External links 

Friends of the Honau-Lichtenstein Rack Railway Society
Swabian Jura Railway Society
1944/45 timetable
Honau Station Preservation Society
Friends of the Railbus Society, Ulm - Ulmer Spatz

Railway lines in Baden-Württemberg
Swabian Jura